Roberto Fleitas (born 25 May 1932) is a Uruguayan football head coach and former center back who managed the Uruguay national team and several top level Uruguayan clubs.

Career
He played as a center back. After retiring, Roberto Fleitas started a career as a head coach. He won the 1987 Copa América as Uruguay national football team coach, and won the 1992 Uruguayan Primera División, the  1988 Copa Libertadores and the 1988 Intercontinental Cup as Nacional's head coach. He won the South American Coach of the Year award in 1988.

References

1932 births
Living people
Uruguayan footballers
Uruguayan football managers
1987 Copa América managers
Uruguay national football team managers
Club Nacional de Football managers
Peñarol managers
Association football central defenders
C.A. Progreso managers